Humanity has used animal hides since the Paleolithic, for clothing as well as mobile shelters such as tipis and wigwams, and household items. Since ancient times, hides have also been used as a writing medium, in the form of parchment.

Fur clothing was used by other hominids, at least the Neanderthals.

Rawhide is a simple hide product, that turns stiff. It was formerly used for binding pieces of wood together. Today it is mostly found in drum skins.

Tanning of hides to manufacture leather was invented during the Paleolithic.

Parchment for use in writing was introduced during the Bronze Age and later refined into vellum, before paper became commonplace.

Prehistoric and Ancient use

Ian Gilligan (Australian National University) has argued convincingly that hominids without fur would have needed leather clothing to survive outside the tropics in mid-latitude Eurasia, southern Africa, and the Levant during the cold glacial and stadial periods of the Ice Age, and there is archaeological evidence for the use of hide and leather in the Paleolithic.

Simple, unmodified stone flakes could have been used to scrape hides for tanning, but scraper tools are more specialized for tasks such as woodworking and hideworking. Both of these stone tool shapes were invented in the Oldowan, but direct evidence for hideworking has not been found from earlier than about 400,000 years ago. Examination of microscopic use-wear on scrapers demonstrates they were used to prepare hides at that time at Hoxne in England.

The earliest known bone awls date to between 84,000 and 72,000 years ago in South Africa, and their use-wear shows that they were probably used to pierce soft materials, such as tanned leather. Bone awls were later made in the Aurignacian in Europe, west Asia, and Russia, and also in Tasmania during the Last Glacial Maximum. The earliest eyed sewing needles date to between 43,000 and 28,500 years ago, probably at least 35,000 years ago, in southern Siberia, and were used across Paleolithic Eurasia and in North America.

Paleolithic hunters are also known to have targeted fur-bearing animals, such as wolves and arctic foxes in Europe, snow leopards in Central Asia, mole-rats in Africa, and red-necked wallabies in Tasmania.

As animal husbandry was introduced during the Neolithic, human communities got a steady source of hides. The oldest confirmed leather tanning tools were found in ancient Sumer and date to approximately 5,000 BCE. The oldest surviving piece of leather footwear is the Areni-1 shoe that was made in Armenia around 3,500 BCE. Another, possibly older, piece of leather was found in Guitarrero Cave in northern Peru, dating to the Archaic period.

The first written references to leather are documented from Ancient Egypt around 1,300 BCE. Various substances used were tannin obtained from trees, as well as animal brains, or faeces. The odor from tanning separated the tanneries from populated areas.

Medieval use
During the Middle Ages, as leather craft was developed, welt shoes and turnshoes were invented. Refined kinds of leather such as suede and nubuck were also introduced.

Modern use
New kinds of tanning chemicals came to use during the Industrial Revolution. Chromium tanning was invented during the 1850s. Patent leather has been manufactured since 1819. Phenol formaldehyde resin came into use during World War II.

Fur farming was introduced in the 19th century, and is today the main source of fur clothing. Synthetic fur is an alternative to genuine fur, for cost and ethical reasons.

Several kinds of synthetic leather have been invented during the 20th century.

See also

 Boiled leather
 Bota bag
 Buckskin
 Colambre
 Goatskin (material)
 History of clothing and textiles
 Parfleche
 Plains hide painting
 Waterskin

Notes

References

Hides (skin)
hide